Holbrook House or Holbrook Farm may refer to:

Places in England 

Holbrook Farm, land common to Melksham Without and Broughton Gifford parishes, Wiltshire

Places in the United States 

Hatch House (Greensboro, Alabama), also known as Holbrook House, NRHP-listed
William Holbrook House, Davenport, Iowa, listed on the NRHP in Scott County, Iowa
Dr. Amos Holbrook House, Milton, Massachusetts, NRHP-listed
Charles Holbrook House, Sherborn, Massachusetts, NRHP-listed
Sylvanus Holbrook House, Uxbridge, Massachusetts, NRHP-listed
Richard Holbrook Houses, Waltham, Massachusetts, NRHP-listed
Holbrook Farm (Traphill, North Carolina), NRHP-listed, National Register of Historic Places listings in Wilkes County, North Carolina
Deacon John Holbrook House, Brattleboro, Vermont, listed on the NRHP in Windham County, Vermont
Dr. Fisk Holbrook Day House, Wauwatosa, Wisconsin, NRHP-listed

See also
Holbrook Bridge (disambiguation)
Holbrook Square Historic District, Holbrook, Massachusetts, NRHP-listed
Holbrook-Ross Street Historic District, Danville, Virginia, listed on the NRHP in Danville, Virginia